The discography of American rock band Sonic Youth comprises 15 studio albums, seven extended plays, three compilation albums, seven video releases, 21 singles, 46 music videos, ten releases in the Sonic Youth Recordings series, eight official bootlegs, and contributions to 16 soundtracks and other compilations.

In 1981, Sonic Youth signed with Neutral Records, and released its eponymous debut EP Sonic Youth the next year. The band's first full-length album was Confusion is Sex, released in 1983. Kill Yr Idols was released the same year under the German label Zensor Records. Bad Moon Rising was released two years later on Blast First, a label created specifically for Sonic Youth releases. In 1986, Sonic Youth signed to SST Records and released Evol later the same year. The album gained the band increasing critical acclaim and exposure, and the group released Sister and the double LP Daydream Nation in 1987 and 1988, respectively, the latter on Enigma Records.

In 1990, the band signed to major label DGC Records, and released Goo the same year. The band's 1991 tour with the then little-known band Nirvana was documented in the film 1991: The Year Punk Broke. In 1992, Sonic Youth released Dirty. Two years later, the group released Experimental Jet Set, Trash and No Star, and Washing Machine the following year.

Forced to start from scratch after its instruments and equipment were stolen, the band released NYC Ghosts & Flowers in 2000. Sonic Youth released Murray Street in the summer of 2002, followed in 2004 by Sonic Nurse. Rather Ripped and The Destroyed Room: B-sides and Rarities were released in 2006, the latter featuring tracks previously available only on vinyl, limited-release compilations, B-sides to international singles, and other previously unreleased material. The Eternal was released three years later in 2009.

Studio albums

Live albums

Extended plays

Compilations

Sonic Youth Recordings (SYR) series
Sonic Youth have released a number of mostly experimental and instrumental releases under their own label Sonic Youth Recordings. The SYR series has established a tradition where each album is released in a different language. SYR1 has song titles and album sleeve artwork all in French, SYR2 is in Dutch, SYR3 is in Esperanto, SYR4 is in English, SYR5 is in Japanese, SYR6 is in Lithuanian, SYR7 is in Arpitan, SYR8 is in Danish, SYR9 is in French, and AUG5 is in English.

Official bootlegs

Singles
Note: Sonic Youth have never charted on the Billboard Hot 100.

Music videos

Soundtracks, tributes and other compilation appearances

Video releases

References
General

Specific

External links
 
 
 
Sonic Youth at Rate Your Music

Discography
Discographies of American artists
Rock music group discographies
Alternative rock discographies